Mehmet Atıf Tüzün (1885 – 3 April 1970) was a Turkish politician. He was a member of parliament, being a representative from Rize. He also served as the governor of Ankara, and was furthermore involved in activities regarding the transition to a multi-party system.

References

External link
 

1885 births
1970 deaths
Place of death missing
People from Artvin
20th-century Turkish politicians